Chernykh, also transliterated Černych is a Russian surname. It may refer to:

 Alexander Chernykh (born 1965), Russian ice hockey player
 Dmitry Chernykh (disambiguation), several people
 Fedor Černych (born 1991), Lithuanian footballer
 Igor Chernykh (1932–2020), Russian camera operator
 Lyudmila Chernykh (1935–2017), Soviet astronomer
 Nikolai Chernykh (1931–2004), Soviet astronomer

Other 
 2325 Chernykh
 101P/Chernykh

See also
 
 Cerna (surname)
 Cerna (disambiguation)

Russian-language surnames